Uperodon rohani, commonly known as Rohan's globular frog, is a species of Microhylid frog. It is endemic to Sri Lanka.

Etymology 
It was named after Rohan Pethiyagoda, a scientist who is renowned for his works on Sri Lankan fishes and amphibians, among others.

Taxonomy 
It was previously considered conspecific with Uperodon variegatus, but was separated in 2018. The genetic difference between them is large, around 2.8%.

Description 
It is maroon with slightly pale olive yellow spots, blotches and streaks. Near its belly and thigh there are densely packed olive speckles. It has a partially translucent foot and ankle.

Distribution 
It is found throughout Sri Lanka, but is most abundant in the lowlands.

Habitat 
It is found in wet environments, such as ponds and puddles. It regularly interacts with humans, being common in water bodies and reservoirs, agricultural land such as paddyfields, and moist locations within houses and buildings, such as bathrooms.

References 

Fauna of Sri Lanka
rohani